Andrew Waddell may refer to:

 Andrew Waddell (referee) (born 1950), football referee
 Andrew Waddell (politician) (born 1966), Western Australian politician